Manoj Guinness is an Indian actor and comedian who appears in Malayalam films, television and stage shows.

Personal life
Manoj hails from Ernakulam, Kerala. Manoj did his schooling from Govt High School Ambalamugal and Gateway High School. Manoj completed his college education from Al-Ameen College, Edathala, Aluva. During his school and college days, Manoj performed Mimicry on stage. He has three siblings. His younger brother Ajith appeared in ‘Elayanila’ and ‘Minnale’ aired in Jeevan TV. Ajith worked as scriptwriter for the film ‘Money Ratnam’ which had Fahad Faasil in lead role. He is married and has one child and currently resides in his hometown Karimugal, Kerala.

Career
Guinness started his career as a mimicry artist in Cochin Century. He later shifted to Cochin Guinness, a popular mimicry troupe. He appeared in numerous stage shows worldwide.

He also performed as the lead in the TV show Badai Bungalow.

Filmography

Television

References

Living people
Male actors from Kochi
Male actors in Malayalam cinema
Indian male film actors
21st-century Indian male actors
Male actors in Malayalam television
Indian male television actors
Year of birth missing (living people)